James Michael Belshaw (born 12 October 1990) is an English professional footballer who plays as a goalkeeper for Bristol Rovers.

Career

Youth & College
Belshaw attended The Becket School in West Bridgford, where he captained the team to the Notts Schools Cup title in 2009. He also had spells with Notts County, Heanor Town and Walsall.

In 2009, Belshaw rejected a one-year professional contract with Walsall, and instead moved to the United States to play college soccer at Duke University. He made 78 appearances for the Blue Devils between 2009 and 2012. During his time at Duke, Belshaw won accolades such as 2012 NSCAA All-America third team, was a two-time All-ACC first team selection, a three-time All-ACC choice, earning second team honors in 2010 and earned NSCAA All-South Region honors all four seasons.

Return to England
On 22 January 2013, Belshaw was selected 49th overall in the 2013 MLS Supplemental Draft by Chicago Fire. Belshaw was offered a contract by Chicago, but as a backup goalkeeper, so instead opted to search for first team football back in his native England.

In April 2013, Belshaw had trials with his former team Walsall, as well as Everton, Notts County and Coventry City.

On 31 July 2013, Belshaw signed with National League club Nuneaton Borough. Following one season with Nuneaton, Belshaw moved to National League North side Tamworth where he played for three seasons.

Harrogate Town
In 2017, Belshaw moved to Harrogate Town on a two-year contract, where he remained first choice goalkeeper for the club. He was part of the Harrogate team that won promotion to the National League for the first time in the club's history after defeating Brackley Town in the 2018 National League North play-off final. After signing a deal to keep him at the club until 2023 in January 2020, Belshaw helped guide them to the Football League for the first time via the play-offs in 2020.

Bristol Rovers
On 23 July 2021, Belshaw joined recently relegated fellow League Two side Bristol Rovers for an undisclosed fee on a two-year deal. Belshaw's debut came for the club came on 10 August, in a 2–0 EFL Cup defeat to Cheltenham Town. Having been a key part of Rovers' rise up the table from eighteenth on New Years Day to a promotion battle, keeping ten clean sheets in his previous fifteen appearances and becoming a firm fan favourite, Belshaw signed a new deal with the club in March 2022, keeping him at the club until June 2024. In May 2022, Belshaw was awarded the PFA Community Champion award by the Bristol Rovers Community Trust for his work with the Community Trust across the course of the season including becoming the health ambassador and supporting mental health schemes. With the club having achieved promotion on the final day of the season in dramatic fashion, a 7–0 victory taking the club into the final automatic promotion spot at Northampton Town's expense on goals scored, Belshaw was awarded the Bristol Rovers Player of the Year Award at the End of Season awards evening having kept seventeen clean sheets across the season.

Following a 4–3 home defeat to Exeter City in December 2022, manager Joey Barton attributed the blame for all four goals at the door of Belshaw. During the January transfer window, Rovers signed Ellery Balcombe on loan from Brentford, a clause in the loan deal stating that he had to start the first three matches of his spell in order to avoid a fee. Following this three game spell, Balcombe was again selected for a home match against Ipswich Town, in which he kept a first clean sheet for the club, with Belshaw omitted from the first-team squad. Barton revealed prior to the match that with the team having been released, Belshaw's attitude in training had dropped significantly with a warning that he may never play for the club again unless things were to change. His response to the situation however was sufficient for the manager and he returned to consideration. He returned to the starting line-up the following week, keeping a clean-sheet in a 3–0 victory away at Oxford United.

Career Statistics

Personal life
Belshaw has supported Notts County since childhood.

Belshaw is "good friends" with professional basketball player Mason Plumlee, who currently plays for NBA side Charlotte Hornets.

Honours
Harrogate Town
National League play-offs: 2020
National League North play-offs: 2018

Bristol Rovers
League Two third-place promotion: 2021–22

Individual
Bristol Rovers Player of the Year: 2021–22

References

External links
Duke Bio
Harrogate Town Bio

1990 births
Living people
English footballers
English expatriate footballers
Notts County F.C. players
Heanor Town F.C. players
Walsall F.C. players
Duke Blue Devils men's soccer players
Chicago Fire FC draft picks
Nuneaton Borough F.C. players
Tamworth F.C. players
Harrogate Town A.F.C. players
Bristol Rovers F.C. players
Association football goalkeepers
English expatriate sportspeople in the United States
Expatriate soccer players in the United States
English Football League players
National League (English football) players
Footballers from Nottingham
People from Nottingham